Goodnestone is a village and civil parish in the Swale district of Kent, England. The civil parish is called Graveney with Goodnestone.  The village is mainly on the road 'Head Hill Road' towards Graveney.

History

The village was referred to in 1242 as "Godwineston", meaning "the farm or settlement of Godwin". The antiquarian Edward Hasted refers to it in 1798 as 'Goodneston'.

St Bartholomew's Church is an unspoilt Grade I listed, Norman church, built about 1100. The church has not been used for regular worship since 1982, but in 1996 it was vested in the Churches Conservation Trust. It was extensively repaired in 1997, and in 2006 it was understood to be still consecrated.

The other Grade II* listed building in the hamlet, is 'Goodnestone Court'.

References

External links

Villages in Kent
Civil parishes in Kent